Utsāha is an essential factor in matters governing human thoughts and actions, and directs all human achievements because primarily it is the strength of will, firmness of resolve, energy and power, endurance and perseverance, and the joy and elation resulting from achievement of pre-determined objectives.

Meaning
Utsāha (Sanskrit: उत्साह)  means – 'enthusiasm', 'zeal', 'energy', 'strength', 'power', 'fortitude', 'strength of will', 'resolution', 'firmness', 'effort', 'endurance', 'perseverance', cheerfulness', 'joy', 'happiness'; it also means 'initiative' or 'drive'.

As psychical essential
Sridharswami regards joy as the energy (utsāha) of the mind due to the attainment of cherished objects or the union with a beloved person; in other words, utsāha is a mode of essence of the mind; it is an essential psychical element in a violation, which precedes a voluntary action. Therefore, Madhusūdana describes it as a resolution of the mind. Utsāha or enthusiasm is roused in superior persons by the absence of sadness; this dominant state rouses the vira rasa or the emotion of heroism, and by rousing utsāha, jadata or stupor and nidra or sleep caused by physiological action, is inhibited.

As emotional essential
Bharata, the legendary author of Natyashastra, speaks about the nine primary emotions by which Rasa, the primary sentiment that appeals to poetic sensibility, is nourished; they are – rati ('enjoyment'), hāsya ('mirth'), śoka ('grief'), krodha ('anger'), utsāha ('enthusiasm'), bhaya ('fear'), jugupsa ('disgust'), vismaya ('surprise') and sama or śanta ('peace'), based respectively on nine navarasas ('primary sentiments'). Utsāha or energy relates to 'virya rasa' and to persons of the superior types. Utsaha is a 'bhava' (emotional state) caused by Determinants such as absence of sadness, power, patience, heroism and the like, and is represented on the stage by Consequents such as steadiness, munificence, boldness of an undertaking and the like.

As divine essential
According to Abhinavagupta the rasas are like gods, and śanta is like their highest centre, Shiva, he insists on transcendence as the highest value in literary aesthetics. Bharata does not consider complete detachment, Nirveda (world-weariness) as the sthāyibhāva of śanta because detachment ordinarily does not arise from knowledge of the truth. Ishvarakrishna states that from detachment comes only prākrtilaya i.e. the dissolution of the eight causes, and not moksha, and Patanjali states that from knowledge of truth arises aversion to the gunas (detachment) which is really the highest state (kaśtha) of knowledge. Atman alone, possessed of pure qualities such as knowledge, bliss etc., and devoid of enjoyment of imagined sense-objects, is the sthāyibhāva of śanta. Śanta is sama and sama is the true nature of the Self. Energy may be said to be based on egoism as its essence, and śanta may be said to consist in the loosening of egoism, but there is no state that is devoid of utsāha (energy). Utsāha or dynamic energy is the sthāyibhāva or primary state of vira rasa, without utsāha one cannot act; Nātya Śastra VI.66 tells us that vira rasa is a dynamic energy (utsāha) which arises from various causal factors (arthaśeśa) such as decisiveness, not giving way to depression, not being surprised or confused.

As rational essential
A ruler is supposed to possess and the means of gaining three kinds of shakti (powers) viz., the powers of mantra (counsel), prabhutva (command over material resources) and utsāha (energy). Yudhishthira considered counsel as being superior to the command over material resources and dignity, and Chanakya puts utsāha in the lowest position among these three powers. Utsāha also refers to heroic energy or effort. "Resolve is the root of king’s righteousness…He who is strong on resolve rules over those strong on words." Mahabharata (XII.58.13-15),and utsāha is one's resolve. The Vedic king was not regarded as the lord of the earth (bhu-pati) but the lord of men (nr-pati) (Rig Veda IV.38.2)  or cattle (go-pati)(Rig Veda VI.28.3); it is at the time of the epics that territorial rights had assumed a dominant role.

As realistic essential
Bhagavad Gita (XVIII.26)  refers to utsāha as the untiring self-application and dynamic enthusiasm for achieving a chosen goal. Krishna tells Arjuna that one who performs his duty without association with the modes of material nature, without false ego, with great determination and enthusiasm ( धृत्युत्साहसमन्वितः), without wavering in success or failure is said to be a worker in the mode of goodness; this means that such a person is always enthusiastic till the completion of such work. Ramana uses the word, uran to refer to the strength of will, self-control or knowledge or to mean specifically strength of conviction to know oneself.

As working instrument in Yoga
Aurobindo recalls to mind the combined working of the four great instruments of Yoga for gaining Yoga-siddhi or perfection in yoga, viz., śāstra i.e. the knowledge of truths, principles, powers and processes that govern self-realization, utsāha, the patient and the persistent action on the force of personal effort on the lines laid down by knowledge, gurū or teacher and kāla the instrumentality of Time. Utsāha is a mental spirit (mānasī kriyā) which leads to promptness in every action. But, in Amera Kosha it occurs as a synonyme of adhyavasāya meaning Buddhi or intelligence, and Mitākshara explains adhyavasāya or utsāha – पुरुषार्थसाधन कर्म्मारम्भोऽध्यवसायः - as the effort or perseverance in the performance of acts accomplishing the objects of man. In the context of Spandakarikā (St.15) which states that only the effort directed towards the product of action disappears here (in states of intense introverted contemplation), it has been explained that "the product of action" is the created object of perception, the "effort directed towards it" is the exertion or utsāha inherent in the agency of the Self.

References 

Hindu philosophical concepts
Vedas
Vedanta
Upanishadic concepts
Sanskrit words and phrases
Yoga concepts
Buddhist philosophical concepts